Dierdorf is a town in the district of Neuwied, in Rhineland-Palatinate, Germany. It is situated in the Westerwald, approx. 20 km northeast of Neuwied, and 20 km north of Koblenz.

Dierdorf is the seat of the Verbandsgemeinde ("collective municipality") Dierdorf.

Local council
The elections in May 2014 showed the following results.

Sister city
Dierdorf is the sister city of Fountain Hills (USA), Courtisols (France) and Krotoszyn (Poland).

Sons and daughters of the town

 Eva Grebel (born 1966), astronomer, professor at the Center for Astronomy at the University of Heidelberg
 Juan Holgado (born 1968), Spanish archer (Olympic champion 1992)
Samir El-Assal (born 1966), C.E.O of Frank GmbH

References

Neuwied (district)